Tillandsia capitata is a species of flowering plant in the genus Tillandsia. It is native to Mexico, Honduras, Cuba and the Dominican Republic.

Cultivars 
 |Tillandsia 'Bacchus'
 Tillandsia 'Lorenzo'
 Tillandsia 'Love Knot'
 Tillandsia 'Marron'
 Tillandsia 'Maya'
 Tillandsia 'Old Gold'
 Tillandsia 'Pink Velvet'
 Tillandsia 'Red Fountain'
 Tillandsia 'Rio Hondo'
 Tillandsia 'Vicente Bacaya'

References 

capitata
Flora of Mexico
Flora of Honduras
Flora of Cuba
Flora of the Dominican Republic
Plants described in 1866